Vernon Pelling Elliott (27 July 1912 – 12 October 1996) was a British bassoonist, conductor and composer.

Born into a musical family in 1912, Elliott took up the bassoon at a very early age. From then on he had an eventful, busy and very musical life, one which saw him as a founder member of the Philharmonia Orchestra, a regular player at the Royal Opera House, a much-valued member of Benjamin Britten's English Opera Group orchestra, a conductor of the Royal Philharmonic Orchestra, longtime professor at Trinity College of Music, London and occasional writer.

In 1959 he was asked to help Oliver Postgate by writing a bassoon theme for Ivor the Engine. He went on to compose the highly evocative music to the Smallfilms productions of Noggin the Nog, The Seal of Neptune,  Pogles' Wood, Pingwings and Clangers. A compilation album of his work for Clangers was released in 2001 and an album of his music for Ivor the Engine and Pogles' Wood followed in 2007.

Elliott was a keen sailor, skier and bee-keeper.

References

External links
The Independent – Obituary: Vernon Elliott – (John Pilgrim) – 30 November 1996 – (Accessed: 21 September 2009) 
(4 December 1996 – related to above link)

1912 births
1996 deaths
English classical bassoonists
British male conductors (music)
Contrabassoonists
20th-century British conductors (music)
20th-century British composers
20th-century British male musicians